Kubachi (Dargwa: ГӏярбукI) is an urban locality (an urban-type settlement) in Dakhadayevsky District of the Republic of Dagestan, Russia. As of the 2010 Census, its population was 3,060.

History
Kubachi is the namesake of Kubachi ware, a style of Persian pottery which was found in great abundance here.
In Persian chronicles, the village is mentioned as early as the 4th century under the Persian name of زره‌گران Zerihgaran (Place of chain mail makers).

Urban-type settlement status was granted to Kubachi in 1965.

Administrative and municipal status
Within the framework of administrative divisions, the urban-type settlement of Kubachi is incorporated within Dakhadayevsky District as Kubachi Settlement (an administrative division of the district). As a municipal division, Kubachi Settlement is incorporated within Dakhadayevsky Municipal District as Kubachi Urban Settlement.

External links

References

Notes

Sources

Urban-type settlements in the Republic of Dagestan